The Cormorant class were built as a class of 16-gun ship sloops for the Royal Navy, although they were re-rated as 18-gun ships soon after completion.

Design
The two Surveyors of the Navy – Sir William Rule and Sir John Henslow – jointly designed the class. A notation on the back of the plans held at the National Maritime Museum, Greenwich, states that the designers based their plan on the lines of the captured French sloop Amazon, captured in 1745.

The Admiralty ordered six vessels to this design in February 1793; it ordered a seventh vessel in the following year.  These ships were initially armed with sixteen 6-pounder guns, later supplemented with eight 12-pounder carronades (6 on the quarter deck and 2 on the forecastle).  The 6-pounder guns were eventually replaced by 24-pounder carronades.

Twenty-four more were ordered to the same design in 1805 – 1806, although in this new batch 32-pounder carronades were fitted instead of the 6-pounder guns originally mounted in the earlier batch; the 12-pounder carronades were replaced by 18-pounders, and some ships also received two 6-pounders as chase guns on the forecastle.

Of this second batch one ship (Serpent) was cancelled and another (Ranger) completed to a slightly lengthened variant of the design.

Ships

Batch 1 (with 6-pounder guns)

Batch 2 (with 32-pounder carronades)

 Note 2: The initial contractor for Anacreon, Owen of Ringmore, Devon, went bankrupt in 1810, so work was transferred to Plymouth Dockyard.
 Note 3: The initial contractor for North Star and Hesper, Benjamin Tanner of Dartmouth, went bankrupt in 1807 and the two contracts were transferred to John Cock. 
 Note 4: Ranger was altered on stocks and completed to a slightly longer design, being 111¼ ft on the gundeck.

References 

British Warships in the Age of Sail: 1793–1817, Rif Winfield, Seaforth Publishing, 2007. 

 
Sloop classes